Piotr Jan Szczypa, now known as Peter Szczypa (born 19 April 1948) is a former pair skater who competed for Poland with Janina Poremska and Teresa Skrzek. He is currently the national ladies' figure skating coach of Germany.

Personal life
Szczypa was born on 19 April 1948 in Siemianowice Śląskie. His sister, Joanna Szczypa, is also a skating coach.

Career 
As a pair skater, Szczypa won ten Polish national titles and competed at ten European and five World Championships as well as at the Olympic Winter Games in Grenoble in 1968. Besides his figure skating career he studied international economics and sports. In 1979 he moved to Denmark where he lived for seven years before moving to Germany in 1986.

Peter Szczypa coached Claudia Leistner when she took the gold medal at the 1989 European Championships and silver at the 1989 Worlds. Since the 1990s, he is one of Germany's most successful ladies' figure skating coaches. Based in Mannheim, Szczypa coached four-time German champion Sarah Hecken at the 2010 Olympic Winter Games in Vancouver. He was also the coach of Nathalie Weinzierl who placed 9th at the 2013 European Championships. He has also coached Kristina Isaev and Jonathan Hess.

Competitive highlights

With Poremska

With Skrzek

References

External links 
 
 Sports-Reference: Piotr Szczypa

1948 births
Living people
Polish male pair skaters
Olympic figure skaters of Poland
German figure skating coaches
Polish figure skating coaches
People from Siemianowice Śląskie
Sportspeople from Silesian Voivodeship